The European Council of Spatial Planners (ECTP-CEU) is the umbrella organisation for spatial planning institutes in Europe. It was founded in 1985 (when it was called the European Council of Town Planners, hence its initials in English).  In June 2014 it had 32 members in 24 European countries. When they join, new member organisations sign an International Agreement on the nature of spatial planning, the responsibilities of planners, common educational standards and a code of conduct. It runs an Awards Scheme every two years, giving prizes for outstanding work in creating attractive places.

Current work of ECTP-CEU includes:
 Dissemination of the Charter of European Planning - a manifesto for planning European cities in the 21st century
 The design of a Vision enhancing the quality and efficiency of cities and urban life in Europe
 The production of a guide to spatial planning and territorial cohesion
 Publishing the proceedings of conferences on European spatial development and the preparation of forthcoming conferences
 Organising the next European Urban and Regional Planning Awards.
 Participation in the organisation of the Biennial of European Towns and Town Planners
 Publishing studies on the Recognition of Planning Qualifications in Europe and proposals on the mutual recognition and mobility of planners across Europe
 Organising workshops for young planners on current urban issues and objectives of the European Union relating to territorial and urban planning

Members

Associate:
  Bundessektion – Ingenieurkonsulenten / Bundesfachgruppe Raumplanung, Landschaftsplanung und Geographie - bAIK
  Chambre des Urbanistes de Belgique- CUB
  Vlaamse Vereniging voor Ruimte en Planning - VRP 
  Association of Croatian Urban Planners - UHU-ACUP 
  Cyprus Association of Town Planners - CATP
  Asociace pro urbanismus a územní plánování České republiky - AUUP
  Eesti Planeerijate Ühing - EPU
  Société Française des Urbanistes - SFU  / Office Professionnel de Qualification des Urbanistes - OPQU
  Bundesarchitektenkammer E.V. / Federal Chamber of German Architects - BAK
  Association of Greek Urban Planners & Land Planners - SEPOX
  Magyar Urbanisztikai Társaság - MUT
  Irish Planning Institute - IPI

  Associazione Nazionale degli Urbanisti Urbanisti e dei Pianificatori Territoriali e Ambientali - ASSURB
  Istituto Nazionale di Urbanistica - INU
  Kamra Maltija Ghall-Ippjanar - KMaP
  Forum for Kommunale Planlegging - FKP
  Associação Portuguesa de Urbanistas - APU
  Registrul Urbaniştilor din Romăniă - RUR
  Udruženje urbanista Srbije – UUS
   Združenie pre urbanizmus a územné plánovanie na Slovensku - ZUUPS
  Društvo Urbanistov in Prostorskih Planerjev Slovenije - DUPPS
  Asociación Española de Técnicos Urbanistas - AETU
   Royal Town Planning Institute - RTPI

Corresponding:

  National Territorial Planning Agency - NTPA
  Consejo Superior de los Colegios de Arquitectos de España - UAAU
  Vereinigung für Stadt-, Regional- und Landesplanung - SRL
  Downey Planning
  KPMG Future Analytics
  Association of Architects of Macedonia - AAM
  University of Gdansk - Faculty of Architecture
  University of Belgrade - Faculty of Architecture

Executive Committee Members 
Autumn 2019 - Autumn 2021
 President / Treasurer : Michael Stein
 Vice-President : Janet Askew
 Secretary-General : Joris Scheers
 Administrators : Vladan Djokic, Chantal Guillet, Rachel Ivers (resigned on 22/02/2021)

Autumn 2017 - Autumn 2019
 President : Ignacio Pemán
 Vice-President / Treasurer : Michael Stein
 Secretary-General : Joris Scheers
 Administrators : Janet Askew, Vladan Djokic, Henk Van der Kamp

Autumn 2015 - Autumn 2017
 President : Joris Scheers
 Vice-President : Henk Van der Kamp
 Secretary-General : Dominique Lancrenon
 Treasurer : Michael Stein
 Administrators : Vincent Goodstadt, Ignacio Pemán, João Teixeira

Autumn 2013 - Autumn 2015
 President : Henk Vander Kamp
 Vice-President : Joris Scheers
 Secretary-General : Dominique Lancrenon
 Treasurer : Michael Stein
 Administrators : Vincent Goodstadt, Ignacio Pemán, João Teixeira

Awards
The European Urban & Regional Planning Awards were inaugurated in 1990 by the former European Council of Town Planners (ECTP) supported by the European Commission. The biennial awards have the stated objectives to: 
 demonstrate successful and innovative planning projects and developments which improve the quality of life of European citizens 
 promote the ECTP-CEU Vision of the future of European cities and regions – a way to create and enhance conditions favourable to sustainable development. 
 illustrate the diversity and wide scope of planning activity 
 demonstrate the advantages of  participation in the planning process, facilitated and enabled by professional planners 
 the concept of “territorial cohesion” 
 explain how stakeholders in spatial development formulate joint strategies to tackle problems in an inter-connected world.

Recipients:
 1991 1st Planning Awards
 Citizen participation in urban planning at Solingen, Germany, (Urban Planning)
 The West Forest Park Project, Denmark, Danish Forest and Nature Agency (Rural Planning)
 The Development and Planning between France and Geneva, Haute-Savoie (Cross-Border Planning)
 Programma Risorgive Storga, Italy, Provincia di Treviso (Special Award: Best Planning Document)
 Barcelona 2000, Spain, Barcelona City Council (Community’s Special Award: Strategic City Planning in a European context)
 1994 2nd Planning Awards
 Rehabilitation of the Matera historical site and the facing Murgia high plateau, Italy (Urban Planning)
 The Lancashire Green Audit, the Lancashire Environmental Action Plan, the Lancashire Structure Plan, UK (Regional Planning) 
 Lyon 2010: Strategic Planning in Action, France (Regional Planning Award)
 Bedre By – Towards the Sustainable City, Aalborg, Denmark (Best Planning Document)
 1998 3rd Planning Awards
 Historic Santiago de Compostela Cherishes its Past, Spain (Local Planning)
 Popular support for Po Delta Plan, Italy (Regional Planning)
 Keeping old Toledo Alive, Spain, in association with USA (Planning between EU and other countries)

 2002 4th Planning Awards
 Land Planning Guidelines for Valladolid, Spain (Category: Planning)
 The ROM-Project for the Gent canal Zone, Belgium (Category: Regional Planning)
 Special Plan for the Old City of León, Spain (Category: Urban Design)
 Südstadt, Tübingen, Germany (Category: Conversion and Renewal)
 The Village, Caterham-on-the-Hill, England (Category: Conversion and Renewal)
 Kanaalzone Plan at Apeldoorn, The Netherlands (Category: Water and City)
 2004 5th Planning Awards
 Abandoibara regeneration project and new southern railway line (OAVS), Bilbao, Spain (Category: Local Plans: Re-development)
 Urban Restructuring: Workshop for the City's Future, Leinefelde, Germany (Category: Local Plans: Re-development)
 Master Plan Steigereiland, Amsterdam, Netherlands (Category: Local Plans: New Development )
 Child-Friendly Urban Renewal in Prenzlauer Berg, Berlin, Germany (Category: Urban & Neighbourhood Management)
 2006 6th Planning Awards

 Asturias Coastal Zone Protection Plan (POLA), Spain (Category: Regional Planning )
 The Basque Regional Strategy, Spain (Category: Regional Planning )
 Local Spatial Plan for Wzgórze Św. Bronisławy (St. Bronisława Hill), Poland (Category: Local Planning)
 Parc Saint-Léonard, Liège, Belgium (Category: Urban Design)
 The Bullring, Birmingham (Category: Urban Design)
 2008 7th Planning Awards
 The Green Metropolis - tri-national regional development project, Germany-Netherlands-Belgium (Category: Cross-Border Planning / Regional Planning / Territorial Cohesion)
 Drammen, Norway (Category: Urban Region)
 Rombeek-Enschede, Netherlands (Category: Public Participation in Planning)
 Stonebridge, London, UK (Category: Public Participation in Planning)
 Ecocity of Sarriguren, Spain (Category: Environmental / Sustainability)
 2010 8th Planning Awards, presented in Brussels

 Cross-border Geneva: an urban project as the cornerstone for a united conurbation, Geneva
 Progetto Po – Plans, programmes and projects for the protection and enhancement of the Po River in Piedmont, Italy
 Liverpool One - Regeneration, Renewal, Reinvention, UK
 Torino Town Plan, Italy
 Transformation plan of La Mina neighbourhood in the Barcelona conurbation, Spain
 2012 9th Planning Awards
 Central Madrid Project, Spain
 The Garden City - Jardin Plessis Robinson, France
 2014 10th Planning Awards
 Embarking the Whole Territory on the Path of Sustainability - Department of Town and Country Planning, Housing and Energy, Republic and State of Geneva, Switzerland
 Montmélian and its future Triangle Sud solar area, France
 Fornebu green town built on outstanding national and international expertise, Norway
 Limburg Territorial Development Programme, Belgium

References

External links
 ECTP-CEU Official site

Urban planning organizations